The electoral district of Portland was an electoral district of the Legislative Assembly in the Australian state of Victoria.

It was based on the town of Portland, Victoria.

Members for Portland

Napthine went on to represent the Electoral district of South-West Coast which was created in 2002.

Election results

References

Former electoral districts of Victoria (Australia)
1856 establishments in Australia
1904 disestablishments in Australia
1945 establishments in Australia
2002 disestablishments in Australia